Diocese of Singapore was an Anglican diocese which covered the Straits Settlements, Peninsular Malaya, Siam, Java, Sumatra and adjacent islands. It was consecrated on 24 August 1909. Later the diocese was renamed Diocese of Singapore and Malaya on 6 February 1960. It should not be confused with the current Diocese of Singapore, created in 1970 when the Diocese of Singapore and Malaya was separated into the Dioceses of Singapore and West Malaysia.

Bishop

See also
Diocese of Singapore and Malaya
Diocese of West Malaysia
Anglican Diocese of Singapore (1970)
Anglican Communion

References

Anglican dioceses established in the 20th century
Singapore (1909)
Christian organizations established in 1909
1960 disestablishments in Singapore
Former Anglican dioceses